William Nolan (4 September 1888 – 23 July 1916) was an Australian rules footballer who played with Richmond in the Victorian Football League. He died of wound sustained in France while serving with the First AIF in World War I.

Family
The son of John Patrick Nolan (1839-1920), and Elizabeth Mary Nolan (1855-1929), née Cullen, William Nolan was born in the northern Victorian town of Corop on 4 September 1888.

Football
His 30 game career with Richmond, as a ruckman, ended with his enlistment in the First AIF.

Death
He died of wound sustained in action at Fleurbaix, France on 23 July 1916.

See also
 List of Victorian Football League players who died in active service

Footnotes

References
 Hogan P: The Tigers Of Old, Richmond Football Club, (Melbourne), 1996. 
 Holmesby, Russell & Main, Jim (2007). The Encyclopedia of AFL Footballers. 7th ed. Melbourne: Bas Publishing.
 Main, J. & Allen, D., "Nolan, Bill", pp. 137–139 in Main, J. & Allen, D., Fallen – The Ultimate Heroes: Footballers Who Never Returned From War, Crown Content, (Melbourne), 2002. 
 Roll of Honour: Sergeant William Nolan (3201), Australian War Memorial.
 World War One Service Record: Sergeant William Nolan (3201), National Archives of Australia.
 Australian Red Cross Society Wounded and Missing Enquiry Bureau files, 1914-18 War: 1DRL/0428: 3201 Sergeant William Nolan: 58th Battalion, collection of the Australian War Museum.
 Casualty Lists Nos. 194 and 195: Died of Wounds: Victoria, The (Melbourne) Leader, (Saturday, 19 August 1916), p.36.
 Greenberg, Tony, "Tribute to Top Tiger Trooper" , richmondfc.com.au, 21 April 2017.
 Jones, Noelle, "Tramway ANZAC: William Nolan: Richmond Footballer and Cable Tram Gripman", Melbourne Tram Museum, 2017.

External links
 
 

1888 births
1916 deaths
Australian rules footballers from Victoria (Australia)
Richmond Football Club players
Australian military personnel killed in World War I
Military personnel from Victoria (Australia)